Judas Iscariot (died  AD) was thought to be a disciple and one of the original Twelve Apostles of Jesus Christ. According to all four canonical gospels, Judas betrayed Jesus to the Sanhedrin in the Garden of Gethsemane by kissing him on the cheek and addressing him as "master" to reveal his identity in the darkness to the crowd who had come to arrest him. His name is often used synonymously with betrayal or treason.

The Gospel of Mark gives no motive for Judas's betrayal, but does present Jesus predicting it at the Last Supper, an event also described in all the other gospels. The Gospel of Matthew  states that Judas committed the betrayal in exchange for thirty pieces of silver. The Gospel of Luke  and the Gospel of John  suggest that he was possessed by Satan. The priests used the money to buy a field to bury strangers in, which was called the "Field of Blood" because it had been bought with blood money. The Book of Acts  quotes Peter as saying that Judas used the money to buy the field himself and, he "[fell] headlong... burst asunder in the midst, and all his bowels gushed out." His place among the Twelve Apostles was later filled by Matthias.

Due to his notorious role in all the gospel narratives, Judas remains a controversial figure in Christian history. His betrayal is seen as setting in motion the events that led to Jesus's crucifixion and resurrection, which, according to traditional Christian theology, brought salvation to humanity. The Gnostic Gospel of Judas—rejected by the proto-orthodox Church as heretical—portrays Judas's actions as done in obedience to instructions given to him by Jesus, and that he alone amongst the disciples knew Jesus's true teachings. Since the Middle Ages, Judas has sometimes been portrayed as a personification of the Jewish people and his betrayal has been used to justify Christian antisemitism.

Historicity
Although Judas Iscariot's historical existence is generally widely accepted among secular historians, this relative consensus has not gone entirely unchallenged. The earliest possible allusion to Judas comes from the First Epistle to the Corinthians , in which Paul the Apostle does not mention Judas by name, but uses the passive voice of the Greek word paradídōmi (παραδίδωμι), which most Bible translations render as "was betrayed": "...the Lord Jesus on the night when he was betrayed took a loaf of bread..." Nonetheless, some biblical scholars argue that the word paradídōmi should be translated as "was handed over". This translation could still refer to Judas, but it could also instead refer to God metaphorically "handing Jesus over" to the Romans.

In his book Antisemitism and Modernity (2006), the Jewish scholar Hyam Maccoby suggests that, in the New Testament, the name "Judas" was constructed as an attack on the Judaeans or on the Judaean religious establishment held responsible for executing Jesus. In his book The Sins of Scripture (2009), John Shelby Spong concurs with this argument, insisting, "The whole story of Judas has the feeling of being contrived ... The act of betrayal by a member of the twelve disciples is not found in the earliest Christian writings. Judas is first placed into the Christian story by the Gospel of Mark, who wrote in the early 70s CE."

Most scholars reject these arguments for non-historicity, noting that there is nothing in the gospels to associate Judas with Judeans except his name, which was an extremely common one for Jewish men during the first century, and that numerous other figures named "Judas" are mentioned throughout the New Testament, none of whom are portrayed negatively. Positive figures named Judas mentioned in the New Testament include the prophet Judas Barsabbas (Acts 15:22–33), Jesus's brother Jude (Mark 6:3; Matt 13:55; Jude 1), and the apostle Judas the son of James (Luke 6:14–16; Acts 1:13; John 14:22).

Life

Name and background

The name "Judas" is a Greek rendering of the Hebrew name Judah (Hebrew for "God is thanked"), which was an extremely common name for Jewish men during the first century AD, due to the renowned hero Judas Maccabeus. Consequently, numerous other figures with this name are mentioned throughout the New Testament. In the Gospel of Mark , which was written in the mid-60s or early 70s AD, Judas Iscariot is the only apostle named "Judas".  shares this portrayal. The Gospel of Luke , however, replaces the apostle whom Mark and Matthew call "Thaddeus" with "Judas son of James". Peter Stanford suggests that this renaming may represent an effort by the author of the Gospel of Luke to create a "good Judas" in contrast to the betrayer Judas Iscariot.

Judas's epithet "Iscariot" ( or ), which distinguishes him from the other people named "Judas" in the gospels, is usually thought to be a Greek rendering of the Hebrew phrase ,, meaning "the man from Kerioth". This interpretation is supported by the statement in the Gospel of John  that Judas was "the son of Simon Iscariot". Nonetheless, this interpretation of the name is not fully accepted by all scholars. One of the most popular alternative explanations holds that "Iscariot" (in Syriac Aramaic, per the Peshitta text) may be a corruption of the Latin word , meaning "dagger man", which referred to a member of the Sicarii ( in Aramaic), a group of Jewish rebels who were known for committing acts of terrorism in the 40s and 50s AD by assassinating people in crowds using long knives hidden under their cloaks. This interpretation is problematic, however, because there is nothing in the gospels to associate Judas with the Sicarii, and there is no evidence that the cadre existed during the 30s AD when Judas was alive.

A possibility advanced by Ernst Wilhelm Hengstenberg is that "Iscariot" means "the liar" or "the false one", from the Hebrew . Stanford rejects this, arguing that the gospel-writers follow Judas's name with the statement that he betrayed Jesus, so it would be redundant for them to call him "the false one" before immediately stating that he was a traitor. Some have proposed that the word derives from an Aramaic word meaning "red color", from the root . This would mean "to deliver", based on the LXX rendering of Isaiah 19:4—a theory advanced by J. Alfred Morin. The epithet could also be associated with the manner of Judas's death, hanging. This might indicate that the epithet was applied posthumously by the remaining disciples, but Joan E. Taylor has argued that it was a descriptive name given to Judas by Jesus, since other disciples such as Simon Peter/Cephas (Kephas "rock") were also given such names.

Role as an apostle

Although the canonical gospels frequently disagree on the names of some of the minor apostles, all four of them list Judas Iscariot as one of them. The Synoptic Gospels state that Jesus sent out "the twelve" (including Judas) with power over unclean spirits and with a ministry of preaching and healing: Judas clearly played an active part in this apostolic ministry alongside the other eleven. However, in the Gospel of John, Judas's outlook was differentiated—many of Jesus' disciples abandoned him because of the difficulty of accepting his teachings, and Jesus asked the twelve if they would also leave him. Simon Peter spoke for the twelve: "Lord, to whom shall we go? You have the words of eternal life," but Jesus observed then that despite the fact that he himself had chosen the twelve, one of them (unnamed by Jesus, but identified by the narrator) was "a devil" who would betray him.

One of the best-attested and most reliable statements made by Jesus in the gospels comes from the Gospel of Matthew , in which Jesus tells his apostles: "in the new world, when the Son of Man shall sit on his glorious throne, you will also sit on twelve thrones, judging the Twelve Tribes of Israel." New Testament scholar Bart D. Ehrman concludes, "This is not a tradition that was likely to have been made up by a Christian later, after Jesus's death—since one of these twelve had abandoned his cause and betrayed him. No one thought that Judas Iscariot would be seated on a glorious throne in the Kingdom of God. That saying, therefore appears to go back to Jesus, and indicates, then, that he had twelve close disciples, whom he predicted would reign in the coming Kingdom."

Matthew directly states that Judas betrayed Jesus for a bribe of "thirty pieces of silver" by identifying him with a kiss—"the kiss of Judas"—to arresting soldiers of the High Priest Caiaphas, who then turned Jesus over to Pontius Pilate's soldiers.

Mark's Gospel states that the chief priests were looking for a way to arrest Jesus. They decided not to do so during the feast [of the Passover], since they were afraid that people would riot; instead, they chose the night before the feast to arrest him. According to Luke's account, Satan entered Judas at this time.

According to the account in the Gospel of John, Judas carried the disciples' money bag or box, but the Gospel of John makes no mention of the thirty pieces of silver as a fee for betrayal. The evangelist comments in John 12:5–6 that Judas spoke fine words about giving money to the poor, but the reality was "not that he cared for the poor, but [that] he was a thief, and had the money box; and he used to take what was put in it." However, in John 13:27–30, when Judas left the gathering of Jesus and his disciples with betrayal in mind, some [of the disciples] thought that Judas might have been leaving to buy supplies or on a charitable errand.

Ehrman argues that Judas's betrayal "is about as historically certain as anything else in the tradition", pointing out that the betrayal is independently attested in the Gospel of Mark, in the Gospel of John, and in the Book of Acts. Ehrman also contends that it is highly unlikely that early Christians would have made up the story of Judas's betrayal, since it reflects poorly on Jesus's judgement in choosing him as an apostle. Nonetheless, Ehrman argues that what Judas actually told the authorities was not Jesus's location, but rather Jesus's secret teaching that he was the Messiah. This, he holds, explains why the authorities did not try to arrest Jesus prior to Judas's betrayal. John P. Meier sums up the historical consensus, stating, "We only know two basic facts about [Judas]: (1) Jesus chose him as one of the Twelve, and (2) he handed over Jesus to the Jerusalem authorities, thus precipitating Jesus' execution."

Death

Many different accounts of Judas's death have survived from antiquity, both within and outside the New Testament.  states that, after learning that Jesus was to be crucified, Judas was overcome by remorse and attempted to return the 30 pieces of silver to the priests, but they would not accept them because they were blood money, so he threw them on the ground and left. Afterwards, he committed suicide by hanging himself according to Mosaic law The priests then used the money to buy a potter's field, which became known as Akeldama (חקל דמא – khakel dama) – the Field of Blood – because it had been bought with blood money.  states that Judas used the money to buy a field, and "[fell] headlong... burst asunder in the midst, and all his bowels gushed out." In this account, Judas's death is apparently by accident and he shows no signs of remorse.

The early Church Father Papias of Hierapolis ( 60–130 AD) recorded in his Expositions of the Sayings of the Lord, which was probably written during the first decade of the second century AD, that Judas was afflicted by God's wrath; his body became so enormously bloated that he could not pass through a street with buildings on either side. His face became so swelled up that a doctor could not even identify the location of his eyes using an optical instrument. Judas's genitals became enormously swollen and oozed with pus and worms. Finally, he killed himself on his own land by pouring out his innards onto the ground, which stank so horribly that, even in Papias' own time a century later, people still could not pass the site without holding their noses. This story was well known among Christians in antiquity and was often told in competition with the two conflicting stories from the New Testament.

According to the apocryphal Gospel of Nicodemus, which was probably written in the fourth century AD, Judas was overcome with remorse and went home to tell his wife, who was roasting a chicken on a spit over a charcoal fire, that he was going to kill himself, because he knew Jesus would rise from the dead and, when he did, he would punish him. Judas's wife laughed and told him that Jesus could no more rise from the dead than he could resurrect the chicken she was cooking. Immediately, the chicken was restored to life and began to crow. Judas then ran away and hanged himself. In the apocryphal Gospel of Judas, Judas has a vision of the disciples stoning and persecuting him.

This problem was one of the points leading C. S. Lewis, for example, to reject the view "that every statement in Scripture must be historical truth". Nonetheless, various attempts at harmonization have been suggested. Generally they have followed literal interpretations such as that of Augustine of Hippo, which suggest that these simply describe different aspects of the same event—that Judas hanged himself in the field, and the rope eventually snapped and the fall burst his body open, or that the accounts of Acts and Matthew refer to two different transactions. Some have taken the descriptions as figurative: that the "falling prostrate" was Judas in anguish, and the "bursting out of the bowels" is pouring out emotion.

Modern scholars reject these approaches. Arie W. Zwiep states that "neither story was meant to be read in light of the other" and that "the integrity of both stories as complete narratives in themselves is seriously disrespected when the two separate stories are being conflated into a third, harmonized version." David A. Reed argues that the Matthew account is a midrashic exposition that allows the author to present the event as a fulfillment of prophetic passages from the Old Testament. They argue that the author adds imaginative details such as the thirty pieces of silver, and the fact that Judas hangs himself, to an earlier tradition about Judas's death.

Matthew's description of the death as fulfilment of a prophecy "spoken through Jeremiah the prophet" has caused difficulties, since it does not clearly correspond to any known version of the Book of Jeremiah but does appear to refer to a story from the Book of Zechariah which describes the return of a payment of thirty pieces of silver. Even writers such as Jerome and John Calvin concluded that this was obviously an error. Evangelical theologian James R. White has suggested the misattribution arises from a supposed Jewish practice of using the name of a Major Prophet to refer to the whole content of the scroll group, including books written by minor prophets placed in the same grouping.

Raymond Brown suggested, "the most plausible [explanation] is that Matthew 27:9–10 is presenting a mixed citation with words taken both from Zechariah and Jeremiah, and ... he refers to that combination by one name. Jeremiah 18–9 concerns a potter (18:2–; 19:1), a purchase (19:1), the Valley of Hinnom (where the Field of Blood is traditionally located, 19:2), 'innocent blood' (19:4), and the renaming of a place for burial (19:6, 11); and Jer 32:6–5 tells of the purchase of a field with silver."

Classicist Glenn W. Most suggests that Judas's death in Acts can be interpreted figuratively, writing that πρηνὴς γενόμενος should be translated as saying his body went prone, rather than falling headlong, and the spilling of the entrails is meant to invoke the imagery of dead snakes and their burst-open bellies. Hence Luke was stating that Judas took the body posture of a snake and died like one. However, the Catholic biblical scholar Fr. John L. McKenzie, S.J., states, "This passage probably echoes the fate of the wicked in..." the Deuterocanonical book Wisdom of Solomon 4:19:  "... [the Lord] will dash them speechless to the ground, and shake them from the foundations; they will be left utterly dry and barren, and they will suffer anguish, and the memory of them will perish."

Betrayal of Jesus

There are several explanations as to why Judas betrayed Jesus. In the earliest account, in the Gospel of Mark, when he goes to the chief priests to betray Jesus, he is offered money as a reward, but it is not clear that money is his motivation. In the Gospel of Matthew account, on the other hand, he asks what they will pay him for handing Jesus over. In the Gospel of Luke and the Gospel of John, the devil enters into Judas, causing him to offer to betray Jesus. The Gospel of John account has Judas complaining that money has been spent on expensive perfumes to anoint Jesus which could have been spent on the poor, but adds that he was the keeper of the apostles' purse and used to steal from it.

One suggestion has been that Judas expected Jesus to overthrow Roman rule of Judea. In this view, Judas is a disillusioned disciple betraying Jesus not so much because he loved money, but because he loved his country and thought Jesus had failed it. Another is that Jesus was causing unrest likely to increase tensions with the Roman authorities and they thought he should be restrained until after the Passover, when everyone had gone back home and the commotion had died down.

The Gospels suggest that Jesus foresaw and allowed Judas's betrayal. One explanation is that Jesus allowed the betrayal because it would allow God's plan to be fulfilled.  Another is that regardless of the betrayal, Jesus was ultimately destined for crucifixion. In April 2006, a Coptic papyrus manuscript titled the Gospel of Judas from 200 AD was translated, suggesting that Jesus told Judas to betray him, although some scholars question the translation. Nevertheless, the Gospel of Judas is an apocryphal Gnostic Gospel composed in the 2nd century and some scholars agree that it contains no real historical information.

Judas is the subject of philosophical writings. Origen of Alexandria, in his Commentary on John's Gospel, reflected on Judas's interactions with the other apostles and Jesus' confidence in him prior to his betrayal. Other philosophical reflections on Judas include The Problem of Natural Evil by Bertrand Russell and "Three Versions of Judas", a short story by Jorge Luis Borges. They allege various problematic ideological contradictions with the discrepancy between Judas's actions and his eternal punishment. Bruce Reichenbach argues that if Jesus foresees Judas's betrayal, then the betrayal is not an act of free will, and therefore should not be punishable. Conversely, it is argued that just because the betrayal was foretold, it does not prevent Judas from exercising his own free will in this matter. Other scholars argue that Judas acted in obedience to God's will. The gospels suggest that Judas is apparently bound up with the fulfillment of God's purposes, yet "woe is upon him", and he would "have been better unborn". The difficulty inherent in the saying is its paradox: if Judas had not been born, the Son of Man would apparently no longer do "as it is written of him." The consequence of this apologetic approach is that Judas's actions come to be seen as necessary and unavoidable, yet leading to condemnation. Another explanation is that Judas's birth and betrayal did not necessitate the only way the Son of Man could have suffered and been crucified. The earliest churches believed "as it is written of him" to be prophetic, fulfilling Scriptures such as that of the suffering servant in Isaiah 52–53 and the righteous one in Psalm 22, which do not require betrayal (at least by Judas) as the means to the suffering. Regardless of any necessity, Judas is held responsible for his act (Mark 14:21; Luke 22:22; Matt 26:24).

In his book The Passover Plot (1965), British New Testament scholar Hugh J. Schonfield suggested that the crucifixion of Christ was a conscious re-enactment of Biblical prophecy and that Judas acted with the full knowledge and consent of Jesus in "betraying" him to the authorities. The book has been variously described as "factually groundless", based on "little data" and "wild suppositions", "disturbing", and "tawdry".

Damnation to Hell
It is speculated that Judas's damnation, which seems possible from the Gospels' text, may not stem from his betrayal of Christ, but from the despair which caused him to subsequently commit suicide. This is confirmed in Cornelius a Lapide's famous commentary, in which he writes that by hanging himself, "Judas then added to his former sin the further sin of despair. It was not a more heinous sin, but one more fatal to himself, as thrusting him down to the very depths of hell. He might, on his repentance, have asked (and surely have obtained) pardon of Christ. But, like Cain, he despaired of forgiveness." The concept that Judas despaired of God's forgiveness is reiterated by Rev. A. Jones in his contribution to a mid-20th C. Catholic commentary: "Filled with remorse (not true 'repentance' because empty of hope) [Judas] sought to dissociate himself from the affair..." before committing suicide (cf. Matthew 27:3–5).

Protestant theologians
Erasmus believed that Judas was free to change his intention, but Martin Luther argued in rebuttal that Judas's will was immutable. John Calvin states that Judas was predestined to damnation, but writes on the question of Judas's guilt: "surely in Judas' betrayal, it will be no more right, because God himself willed that his son be delivered up and delivered him up to death, to ascribe the guilt of the crime to God than to transfer the credit for redemption to Judas." Karl Daub, in his book Judas Ischariot, wrote that Judas should be considered "an incarnation of the devil" for whom "mercy and blessedness are alike impossible."

The Geneva Bible contained several additional notes concerning Judas Iscariot within its commentaries. In the Gospel of Matthew, after the Sanhedrin convicts Jesus Christ to death, are added the comments concerning Judas: "...late repentance brings desperation" (cf. Mat. 27:3), and "Although he abhor his sins, yet is he not displeased there with, but despairs in God's mercies, and seeks his own destruction" (cf. Mat. 27:4). Furthermore, within Acts of the Apostles is the comment, "Perpetual infamy is the reward of all such as by unlawfully gotten goods buy anything" when Judas purchased the "Field of Blood" with the 30 pieces of silver (cf Acts 1:18). Obviously, the commentator had no doubt about the fate of Judas.

Catholic doctrine
The Catholic Church took no specific view concerning the damnation of Judas during Vatican II; speaking in generalities, that Council stated, "[We] must be constantly vigilant so that ... we may not be ordered to go into the eternal fire (cf. Mk. 25, 41) like wicked and slothful servants (cf. Mk. 25, 26), into the exterior darkness where 'there will be the weeping and the gnashing of teeth' (Mt. 22, 13 and 25, 30)." The Vatican only proclaims individuals' Eternal Salvation through the Canon of Saints. There is no 'Canon of the Damned.'

Thus, there is a school of thought within the Catholic Church that it is unknown whether Judas Iscariot is in Hell; for example, Fr. David Endres, writing in The Catholic Telegraph, cites Catechism of the Catholic Church §597 for the inability to make any determination whether Judas is in Hell. However, while that section of the catechism does instruct Catholics that the personal sin of Judas is unknown but to God, that statement is within the context that the Jewish people have no collective responsibility for Jesus' death: "... the Jews should not be spoken of as rejected or accursed as if this followed from holy Scripture." This seems to be defining a different doctrinal point (i.e., the relationship of Catholics with Jewish people), rather than making any sort of decision concerning Judas's particular judgment.

However, Vatican II was a pastoral rather than dogmatic council, and Dr. Christopher J. Malloy (Assistant Professor of Theology at the Constantin College of Liberal Arts at University of Dallas) states that Dr. Ludwig Ott's reference book Fundamentals of Catholic Dogma should be regarded,  "... as being current on the infallible teachings of the Church taught by the extraordinary Magisterium." That reference book identifies Judas Iscariot as an example of a person receiving punishment as a particular judgment.

The Catechism of the Council of Trent, which mentions Judas Iscariot several times, wrote that he possessed "motive unworthy" when he entered the priesthood and was thus sentenced to "eternal perdition." Furthermore, Judas is given as an example of a sinner that will  "despair of mercy" because he looked "...on God as an avenger of crime and not, also, as a God of clemency and mercy." All of the council's decrees were confirmed by Pope Pius IV on 28 January 1564. Thus, an ecumenical council, confirmed by the Magesterium of a Pope, affirmed that Judas Iscariot was condemned to Hell. The Council of Trent continued the tradition of the early Church fathers, such as St. Pope Leo the Great ("...had [Judas] not thus denied His omnipotence, he would have obtained His mercy...") , and St. Pope Gregory Great ("The godless betrayer, shutting his mind to all these things, turned upon himself, not with a mind to repent, but in a madness of self destruction: ... even in the act of dying sinned unto the increase of his own eternal punishment.")

Also, the Decree of Justification, promulgated during Session VI of the Council of Trent, states in Cannon 6, "If anyone shall say that it is not in the power of man to make his ways evil, but that God produces evil as well as the good works, not only by permission, but also properly and of Himself, so that the betrayal of Judas is not less His own proper work than the vocation of Paul; let him be anathema." Here, the Council is making it clear that Judas exercised his own free will to commit the betrayal of Jesus Christ, rather than being predestined by God. Also, by contrasting the actions of Judas to those of St. Paul, the implication is that Judas is the opposite of a saint (i.e., damned).

Liturgical institutions are part of the expressions of Sacred Tradition of the Catholic Church. Within the 1962 Roman Missal for the Tridentine Latin Mass, the Collect for Holy Thursday states: "O God, from whom Judas received the punishment of his guilt, and the thief the reward of his confession ... our Lord Jesus Christ gave to each a different recompense according to his merits..." In his commentary on the Liturgical Year, Abbot Gueranger, O.S.B. states that the Collect reminds Catholics that both Judas and the good thief are guilty, "...and yet, the one is condemned, the other pardoned." Thus, the Tridentine Latin Mass, as currently celebrated, continues to foster the tradition within the Catholic Church that Judas was punished.

Other
In the Divine Comedy of Dante Alighieri, Judas is punished for all eternity in the ninth circle of Hell: in it, he is devoured by Lucifer, alongside Marcus Junius Brutus and Gaius Cassius Longinus (leaders of the group of senators that assassinated Julius Caesar).

In his 1969 book Theologie der Drei Tage (English translation: Mysterium Paschale), Hans Urs von Balthasar emphasizes that Jesus was not betrayed but surrendered and delivered up by himself, since the meaning of the Greek word used by the New Testament, paradidonai (παραδιδόναι), is unequivocally "handing over of self". In the "Preface to the Second Edition", Balthasar takes a cue from Revelation  (Vulgate: agni qui occisus est ab origine mundi, NIV: "the Lamb who was slain from the creation of the world") to extrapolate the idea that God as "immanent Trinity" can endure and conquer godlessness, abandonment, and death in an "eternal super-kenosis". ). A Catholic priest, Fr. Richard Neuhaus, an admitted student of Balthasar, argues that it is unknown if Judas is in Hell, and it is also possible that Hell could be empty. However, Balthasar and Fr. Neuhaus are merely recycling the error of Origenism which includes denying the eternity of Hell "...by a general rehabilitation of the damned, including, apparently, Satan." This error, while not considered a formal heresy, was condemned at a synod in 548 AD, which was subsequently confirmed by Pope Vigilius.

Dr. M. Scott Peck, a psychologist, wrote about his dealings with a woman that was apparently possessed by a demonic being that identified itself as Judas. While the exorcism was initially successful, the woman seemed to revert back into possession.

Role in apocrypha
Judas has been a figure of great interest to esoteric groups, such as many Gnostic sects. Irenaeus records the beliefs of one Gnostic sect, the Cainites, who believed that Judas was an instrument of the Sophia, Divine Wisdom, thus earning the hatred of the Demiurge. His betrayal of Jesus thus was a victory over the materialist world. The Cainites later split into two groups, disagreeing over the ultimate significance of Jesus in their cosmology.

The Syriac Infancy Gospel
The Syriac Infancy Gospel borrows from some of the different versions of the Infancy Gospel of Thomas. However, it adds many of its own tales, probably from local legends, including one of Judas. This pseudepigraphic work tells how Judas, as a boy, was possessed by Satan, who caused him to bite himself or anyone else present. In one of these attacks, Judas bit the young Jesus in the side; and, by touching Him, Satan was exorcised. It further states that the side which Judas supposedly bit was the same side that was pierced by the Holy Lance at the Crucifixion.

Gospel of Judas

During the 1970s, a Coptic papyrus codex (book) was discovered near Beni Masah, Egypt. It appeared to be a 3rd- or 4th-century-AD copy of a 2nd-century original, relating a series of conversations in which Jesus and Judas interact and discuss the nature of the universe from a Gnostic viewpoint. The discovery was given dramatic international exposure in April 2006 when the US National Geographic magazine published a feature article entitled "The Gospel of Judas" with images of the fragile codex and analytical commentary by relevant experts and interested observers (but not a comprehensive translation). The article's introduction stated: "An ancient text lost for 1,700 years says Christ's betrayer was his truest disciple." The article points to some evidence that the original document was extant in the 2nd century: "Around A.D. 180, Irenaeus, Bishop of Lyon in what was then Roman Gaul, wrote a massive treatise called Against Heresies [in which he attacked] a 'fictitious history,' which 'they style the Gospel of Judas.'"

Before the magazine's edition was circulated, other news media gave exposure to the story, abridging and selectively reporting it.

In December 2007, April DeConick asserted that the National Geographics translation is badly flawed: "For example, in one instance the National Geographic transcription refers to Judas as a 'daimon,' which the society's experts have translated as 'spirit.' However, the universally accepted word for 'spirit' is 'pneuma'—in Gnostic literature "daimon" is always taken to mean 'demon.'" The National Geographic Society responded that "Virtually all issues April D. DeConick raises about translation choices are addressed in footnotes in both the popular and critical editions." In a later review of the issues and relevant publications, critic Joan Acocella questioned whether ulterior intentions had not begun to supersede historical analysis, e.g., whether publication of The Gospel of Judas could be an attempt to roll back ancient anti-semitic imputations. She concluded that the ongoing clash between scriptural fundamentalism and attempts at revision were childish because of the unreliability of the sources. Therefore, she argued, "People interpret, and cheat. The answer is not to fix the Bible but to fix ourselves." Other scholars have questioned the initial translation and interpretation of the Gospel of Judas by the National Geographic team of experts.

Gospel of Barnabas

According to medieval copies (the earliest copies from the 15th century) of the Gospel of Barnabas it was Judas, not Jesus, who was crucified on the cross. This work states that Judas's appearance was transformed to that of Jesus, when the former, out of betrayal, led the Roman soldiers to arrest Jesus who by then was ascended to the heavens. This transformation of appearance was so identical that the masses, followers of Christ, and even the Mother of Jesus, Mary, initially thought that the one arrested and crucified was Jesus himself. The gospel then mentions that after three days since burial, Judas's body was stolen from his grave, and then the rumors spread of Jesus being risen from the dead. When Jesus was informed in the third heaven about what happened, he prayed to God to be sent back to the earth, and descended and gathered his mother, disciples, and followers, and told them the truth of what happened.  He then ascended back to the heavens, and will come back at the end of times as a just king.

This Gospel is considered by the majority of Christians to be late and pseudepigraphical; however, some academics suggest that it may contain some remnants of an earlier apocryphal work (perhaps Gnostic, Ebionite, or Diatessaronic), redacted to bring it more in line with Islamic doctrine. Some Muslims consider the surviving versions as transmitting a suppressed apostolic original. Some Islamic organizations cite it in support of the Islamic view of Jesus.

Representations and symbolism

Although the sanctification of the instruments of the Passion of Jesus (the so-called Arma Christi), that slowly accrued over the course of the Middle Ages in Christian symbolism and art, also included the head and lips of Judas, the term Judas has entered many languages as a synonym for betrayer, and Judas has become the archetype of the traitor in Western art and literature. Judas is given some role in virtually all literature telling the Passion story, and appears in numerous modern novels and movies.

In the Eastern Orthodox hymns of Holy Wednesday (the Wednesday before Pascha), Judas is contrasted with the woman who anointed Jesus with expensive perfume and washed his feet with her tears. According to the Gospel of John, Judas protested at this apparent extravagance, suggesting that the money spent on it should have been given to the poor. After this, Judas went to the chief priests and offered to betray Jesus for money. The hymns of Holy Wednesday contrast these two figures, encouraging believers to avoid the example of the fallen disciple and instead to imitate Mary's example of repentance. Also, Wednesday is observed as a day of fasting from meat, dairy products, and olive oil throughout the year in memory of the betrayal of Judas. The prayers of preparation for receiving the Eucharist also make mention of Judas's betrayal: "I will not reveal your mysteries to your enemies, neither like Judas will I betray you with a kiss, but like the thief on the cross I will confess you."

Judas Iscariot is often shown with red hair in Spanish culture
and by William Shakespeare. The practice is comparable to the Renaissance portrayal of Jews with red hair, which was then regarded as a negative trait and which may have been used to correlate Judas Iscariot with contemporary Jews.

In paintings depicting the Last Supper, Judas is occasionally depicted with a dark-colored halo (contrasting with the lighter halos of the other apostles) to signify his former status as an apostle. More commonly, however, he is the only one at the table without one. Some church stained-glass windows show him with a dark halo such as in one of the windows of the Church of St John the Baptist, Yeovil.

Art and literature

Judas is the subject of one of the oldest surviving English ballads, which dates from the 13th century. In the ballad "Judas", the blame for the betrayal of Christ is placed on Judas's sister. In Dante's Inferno, Judas is condemned to the lowest circle of Hell: the Ninth Circle of Traitors, also known as the frozen lake, Cocytus. He is one of three sinners deemed evil enough to be doomed to an eternity of being chewed in the mouths of the triple-headed Satan (the others being Brutus and Cassius, the assassins of Julius Caesar). Dante writes that Judas—having committed the ultimate act of treachery by betraying the Son of God Himself—is trapped in the jaws of Satan's central head, said to be the most vicious Satan's three heads, by his (Judas's) head, leaving Judas's back to be raked by the fallen angel's claws. In art, one of the most famous depictions of Judas Iscariot and his kiss of betrayal of Jesus is The Taking of Christ, by Italian Baroque artist Caravaggio, done in 1602.

In Memoirs of Judas (1867) by Ferdinando Petruccelli della Gattina, he is seen as a leader of the Jewish revolt against the rule of Romans. Edward Elgar's oratorio, The Apostles, depicts Judas as wanting to force Jesus to declare his divinity and establish the kingdom on earth. In Trial of Christ in Seven Stages (1909) by John Brayshaw Kaye, the author did not accept the idea that Judas intended to betray Christ, and the poem is a defence of Judas, in which he adds his own vision to the biblical account of the story of the trial before the Sanhedrin and Caiaphas.

In Mikhail Bulgakov's novel The Master and Margarita, Judas is paid by the high priest of Judaea to testify against Jesus, who had been inciting trouble among the people of Jerusalem. After authorizing the crucifixion, Pilate suffers an agony of regret and turns his anger on Judas, ordering him assassinated. The story within a story appears as a counter-revolutionary novel in the context of Moscow in the 1920s–1930s. "Tres versiones de Judas" (English title: "Three Versions of Judas") is a short story by Argentine writer and poet Jorge Luis Borges; it was included in Borges' anthology Ficciones, published in 1944, and revolves around the main character's doubts about the canonical story of Judas who instead creates three alternative versions. On 17 April 1945, the radio program Inner Sanctum broadcast the story "The Judas Clock", in which the cursed title object, a 16th-century Italian marble longcase clock, is unable to run without the thirty silver coins of Judas being placed in its hollow weights. The episode's main character, played by Berry Kroeger, recites the fate of Judas from Matthew 27:5 (King James version) at the episode's conclusion.

The 1971 novel I, Judas by Taylor Caldwell and Jess Stearn was one of the first published novels to portray Judas in a more sympathetic light. In the 1977 television miniseries Jesus of Nazareth, Judas was famously portrayed by Ian McShane, in a critically acclaimed performance. He is portrayed as being torn between personal loyalty to his Rabbi and social loyalty to the Sanhedrin. Ultimately he is "seduced" into betraying Jesus by the temple scribe Zerah, the fictional character who acts as the series' lead villain.

In Martin Scorsese's 1988 film The Last Temptation of Christ, based on the novel by Nikos Kazantzakis, Judas's only motivation in betraying Jesus to the Romans was to help him accomplish his mission by mutual agreement, making Judas the catalyst for the event later interpreted as bringing about humanity's salvation. In the film Dracula 2000, Dracula (played by Gerard Butler) is revealed in this version to be Judas. God punishes Judas, not only for betraying Jesus, but attempting suicide at dawn, by turning him into the first vampire, and making him vulnerable to silver for taking 30 pieces of silver as payment for his betrayal, and his suicide attempt at dawn also tries to explain a vampire's violent reaction to sunlight. In The Last Days of Judas Iscariot (2005), a critically acclaimed play by Stephen Adly Guirgis, Judas is given a trial in Purgatory. In C. K. Stead's 2006 novel My Name Was Judas, Judas, who was then known as Idas of Sidon, recounts the story of Jesus as recalled by him some forty years later.

British progressive pop/rock band 'It Bites', released a single entitled 'Kiss Like Judas' from their second album, 'Once Around The World' in 1988.

In the epic miniseries The Bible, Judas is portrayed by actor Joe Wredden.

In September 2017, Boom Studios announced a four-issue comic, Judas, written by Jeff Loveness and Jakub Rebelka. In March 2018, BBC Radio 4's 15 Minute Drama broadcast Judas, written by Lucy Gannon, in 5 episodes with Damien Molony in the title role. In the March 2018 film Mary Magdalene, written by Helen Edmundson, Judas is played by Tahar Rahim.

Judas is a lead role in Andrew Lloyd Webber and Tim Rice's Jesus Christ Superstar. The rock opera depicts Judas as somewhat of a tragic figure who is dissatisfied with the direction in which Jesus is steering his disciples. Various actors and singers who have played the role include: Murray Head (original concept album), Ben Vereen (original 1971 Broadway production), Carl Anderson (1973 film adaptation), Roger Daltrey (1996 BBC Radio 2 production), Zubin Varla (1996 London revival), Jérôme Pradon (2000 film adaptation based on the 1996 revival), Tony Vincent (2000 Broadway revival), Corey Glover (2006 "new" A.D. tour), Tim Minchin (2012 Arena Tour), and Brandon Victor Dixon (live 2018 televised concert).

Lady Gaga released a single entitled "Judas" from her 2011 album Born This Way in 2011. In the video, the role of Judas is portrayed by Norman Reedus.

In DC Comics, one of the Phantom Stranger's possible origins is that he is Judas. After his suicide, he is judged by the Circle of Eternity and is sent back to Earth as an eternal agent of God. The thirty silver pieces he received for betraying Jesus is formed into the signature necklace he wears, and his deeds cause pieces to fall off, bringing him closer towards redemption.

The American band Walk the Moon has a song called "Iscariot" on their self-titled album.

See also

 Burning of Judas
 Judas's Ear mushroom (Auricularia auricula-judae)
 Judas goat
 Judas tree
 "Three Versions of Judas"

Explanatory notes

Citations

General and cited references

External links

 "Judas Iscariot" in the Jewish Encyclopedia
 "Gospel Truth": piece in The New York Times on the Gospel of Judas

 
30s deaths
Ancient people who committed suicide
Christianity and antisemitism
Suicides by hanging in Israel
Traitors in history
Twelve Apostles
Year of birth unknown